Richard Ernest Gotham (born August 31, 1964) is an American business executive who is the president of the Boston Celtics of the National Basketball Association (NBA). He is a graduate of Providence College and resident of Medfield, Massachusetts.  On April 18, 2007, Gotham was named president of the Boston Celtics.  Prior to that, he had a successful career as an executive within the online media and Internet technology industries.

College 
Gotham was born in Norwood, Massachusetts. After graduating from Milford High School in 1982, Gotham attended Providence College in Rhode Island.  He graduated in 1986, with a bachelor's degree in Business Administration with a concentration in Marketing. An active alumnus, he is currently a member of the Providence College Boston President's Council, Varsity Athletics Board, and the Vision Team for the Men's Basketball program.

Business career 
Gotham spent five years holding senior management positions with the global internet media company Lycos.  His last job with the company was the Vice-President of Sales and Corporate Development. Prior to that, he was Vice-President of Channel Sales and Market Development with FTP Software.

Boston Celtics 
Gotham left Lycos in April 2003, and joined the Celtics as the organization's Executive Vice-President of Sales, Marketing and Corporate Development. He was promoted to chief operating officer in June 2006.

On April 18, 2007, Gotham was named President of the Celtics.  The position had been vacant since team patriarch Red Auerbach died in October 2006.

See also 
List of National Basketball Association team presidents

References

External links
 Official BostonCeltics.com story
 Sports Illustrated Online Story
 Rich Gotham interview February 2008, Biz of Basketball
 Rich Gotham NECN Video Interview, "Celtics business model all about winning Championships" April 2010

1964 births
Boston Celtics executives
Living people
National Basketball Association executives
Providence College alumni
People from Milford, Massachusetts
People from Medfield, Massachusetts
People from Norwood, Massachusetts
20th-century American businesspeople
American chief operating officers
Sportspeople from Norfolk County, Massachusetts
Sportspeople from Worcester County, Massachusetts